Camellia hiemalis is a species of camellia that is a shrub or small tree, with evergreen leaves and red, pink, or white flowers.

References

 J. Jap. Bot. 16: 695 1940.
 The Plant List
 Japanese Treeflowers

hiemalis